Lymantriopsis is a genus of moths in the subfamily Arctiinae. It contains the single species Lymantriopsis lacteata, which is found in Gabon.

References

Endemic fauna of Gabon
Lithosiini
Monotypic moth genera
Moths of Africa